Sturgeon Falls 23 is a First Nations reserve in Rainy River District, Ontario. It is one of the reserves of the Seine River First Nation.

References

External links
 Canada Lands Survey System

Ojibwe reserves in Ontario
Communities in Rainy River District